Erastus Franklin Gould (July 1, 1822 – June 2, 1896) was an American businessman and banker during the 1800s. Born in Oswego County, New York, he became a successful businessman in the banking industry in Minneapolis, Minnesota before moving to Atlanta, Georgia in 1886.

Early life 
Erastus Franklin Gould was born in Oswego County, New York. He later move to Minneapolis, where he became financially successful in the banking industry.

In 1886, he moved to Atlanta. The following year, he helped found the Traders Bank of Atlanta, which was chartered on October 24, 1887 and officially opened November 1, 1888. Other founders included Hugh T. Inman and Clifford Anderson. Gould had constructed the bank's headquarters in 1887 on Decatur Street. Known as the Traders Bank Building, it was the first office-building skyscraper in Atlanta, rising 7 stories. In 1890, following the renaming of the Traders Bank, the building was known as the Gould Building. Additionally, Gould also had a home constructed for himself in Inman Park. Located on Edgewood Avenue, it was known as "Gould's Marble Palace" because of the Georgia marble used in the building's construction.

Later life and death 
Gould died on June 2, 1896 in Atlanta. He was interred in a mausoleum in Oakland Cemetery. The Gould Building was demolished several years after his death in 1935.

Bibliography

References

External links 
 

People from Oswego County, New York
American bankers
1822 births
1896 deaths
19th-century American businesspeople